Leonards is an unincorporated community located in the town of Cable, Bayfield County, Wisconsin, United States.

History
A post office called Leonard was in operation from 1899 until 1905. The community was named for F. C. Leonard, a businessperson in the logging industry.

Notes

Unincorporated communities in Bayfield County, Wisconsin
Unincorporated communities in Wisconsin